A united church, also called a uniting church, is a church formed from the merger or other form of church union of two or more different Protestant Christian denominations.

Historically, unions of Protestant churches were enforced by the state, usually in order to have a stricter control over the religious sphere of its people, but also other organizational reasons. As modern Christian ecumenism progresses, unions between various Protestant traditions are becoming more and more common, resulting in a growing number of united and uniting churches.

Examples include the United Church of Canada (1925), the  Church of North India (1970), the Uniting Church in Australia (1977), the Protestant Church in the Netherlands (2004), and the United Protestant Church of France (2013). 

Since the mid-20th century, and the rise of secularism worldwide, mainline Protestantism has shrunk. Among others, Reformed (Calvinist), Anglican, and Lutheran churches have merged, often creating large nationwide denominations. In some countries, Methodist and/or Congregational denominations have also merged. The phenomenon is much less common among evangelical, nondenominational and charismatic churches as new ones arise and many of them remain independent of each other.

Perhaps the oldest official united church is found in Germany, where the Evangelical Church in Germany is a federation of Lutheran, United (Prussian Union) and Reformed churches, a union dating back to 1817. The first of the series of unions was at a synod in Idstein to form the Protestant Church in Hesse and Nassau in August 1817, commemorated in naming the church of Idstein Unionskirche one hundred years later.

Around the world, each united or uniting church comprises a different mix of predecessor Protestant denominations. Trends are visible, however, as most united and uniting churches have one or more predecessors with heritage in the Reformed tradition and many are members of the World Alliance of Reformed Churches.

Conciliar movement 
In the 1950s and 1960s an ecumenical spirit emerged in many churches in the United States, leading to a conciliar movement known in some circles as Conciliarity. A product of this movement was the Consultation on Church Union (COCU). The COCU disbanded formally in 2002 but moved into the Churches Uniting in Christ movement.

United and uniting churches around the world 

 Australia: Uniting Church in Australia, the 1977 union of the Congregational Union of Australia, Methodist Church of Australasia, and Presbyterian Church of Australia churches.
 Bangladesh: Church of Bangladesh, established in 1974 as a union of Anglican and Presbyterian churches.
 Belgium: United Protestant Church in Belgium, formed in 1979 as a union of the Reformed and Lutheran churches.
 Canada: United Church of Canada, the 1925 union of Congregationalist, Methodist Church (Canada), and a majority of the Presbyterian Church in Canada (including Bermuda).
 Czech Republic: Evangelical Church of Czech Brethren, formed in 1918 in Czechoslovakia through the unification of the Protestant churches of the Lutheran and Reformed (Calvinist) confessions. However, the ECCB has deeper roots in the Czech Reformation: in the Utraquist Hussite Church (1431–1620) and in the Unity of Brethren aka Moravian Church (1457–1620).
 France: United Protestant Church of France, formed in 2013 through the unification of the Reformed Church of France and the Evangelical Lutheran Church of France.
 Germany: Ten united church bodies within the Evangelical Church in Germany from unions of Lutheran and Reformed churches: Evangelical Church in Berlin, Brandenburg and Silesian Upper Lusatia, the Evangelical Church in the Rhineland, the Evangelical Church of Westphalia (all of them are successors of the Prussian Union of Churches), the Evangelical Church of Anhalt, the Protestant Church in Baden, the Evangelical Church of Bremen, the Evangelical Church in Central Germany, the Protestant Church in Hesse and Nassau, the Evangelical Church of Hesse Electorate-Waldeck and the Evangelical Church of the Palatinate (Protestant State Church).
 India: Church of North India, the 1970 union of Anglican, Methodist, Baptist, Disciples of Christ, Presbyterian, Congregational, and the Church of the Brethren churches.
 India: Church of South India, the 1947 union of Anglican, Methodist, Congregational, Presbyterian, and Reformed churches.
 Indonesia: Indonesia Christian Church or Gereja Kristen Indonesia, union of GKI East Java, GKI West Java and GKI Central Java in 1988, and the Indonesian Gospel Tabernacle Church.
 Italy: Union of Methodist and Waldensian Churches, the 1975 union of Waldensian Evangelical Church and the Methodist Evangelical Church in Italy.
 Jamaica: United Church in Jamaica and the Cayman Islands, the 1965 union of Presbyterian, Congregationalist, and Disciples of Christ churches.
 Japan: United Church of Christ in Japan, the 1941 union of thirty-three Protestant denominations.
 Kiribati: Kiribati Uniting Church, a union of several Protestant denominations in Kiribati, including Congregationalists, Evangelicals, Anglicans, and Presbyterians.
 Melanesia: United Church in Papua New Guinea and Solomon Islands, a United church in the Methodist and the Reformed tradition
 Netherlands: Protestant Church in the Netherlands, the 2004 union of the Dutch Reformed Church, the Reformed Churches in the Netherlands, and the Evangelical Lutheran Church in the Kingdom of the Netherlands.
 Pakistan: Church of Pakistan, the 1970 union of Anglicans, Scottish Presbyterians (Church of Scotland), Methodists, and Lutherans.
 Philippines: United Church of Christ in the Philippines, a merger of the Evangelical Church of the Philippines, the Philippine Methodist Church, the Disciples of Christ, the United Evangelical Church and several independent congregations.
 Sweden: Evangelical Free Church in Sweden, the 2002 union of the Örebro Mission, the Free Baptist Union and the Holiness Union.
 Sweden: Uniting Church in Sweden, the 2011 union of the Baptist Union of Sweden, the Swedish branch of the United Methodist Church, and the Mission Covenant Church of Sweden.
 Thailand: Church of Christ in Thailand
 United Kingdom: United Reformed Church, the 1972 union of the Congregational Union of England and Wales and the Presbyterian Church of England, later joined by the Churches of Christ (Europe) and the Congregational Union of Scotland.
 United Kingdom: United Free Church of Scotland, formed in 1900 by the union of the United Presbyterian Church of Scotland (or UP) and the majority of the 19th-century Free Church of Scotland.
 United States: United Church of Christ, the 1957 union of the two previously united churches: Congregational Christian Churches and the Evangelical and Reformed Church.
 United States: United Methodist Church, the 1968 union of the Methodist Church and the Evangelical United Brethren Church.
 United States: Unitarian Universalist Association, the 1961 consolidation of the American Unitarian Association and the Universalist Church of America.

See also 
 Christianity
 Congregationalist polity
 Continuing church
 English Covenant
 List of Christian denominations

References

 
Church organization